References

1961 television seasons
1962 television seasons